Yeşilköy is a village in the Borçka District, Artvin Province, Turkey. Its population is 133 (2021).

History 
Most villagers are ethnically Laz.

References

Villages in Borçka District
Laz settlements in Turkey